Aspley is an area adjacent to the ring road around Huddersfield, Kirklees, West Yorkshire, England. It comprises a mixture of independent shops, commercial units, a small retail park, houses, student accommodation and sections of the University of Huddersfield and Kirklees Council offices, pubs and fast food outlets. It is known locally as Aspley Wharf.

There is a small narrowboat marina adjacent to the Huddersfield Broad Canal and the Huddersfield Narrow Canal. known as Aspley Basin.

Shopping and entertainment
Smaller supermarkets exist within the retail park such as Asda  (formerly a Netto), Lidl and Iceland located close to the junction of Somerset Road.

See also
Listed buildings in Huddersfield (Newsome Ward - outer areas)

References

External links

 Map location

Areas of Huddersfield